Meryntsi is a town in southern Ukraine located near the Dniester river border with Moldova.

References

Shtetls